Yasothon province, one of Thailand's seventy-six provinces (changwat), lies in central northeastern Thailand also called Isan. The province was established by the revolutionary council of Field Marshal Thanom Kittikachorn, after its Announcement No. 70 which came into force on 3 March 1972.

Neighboring provinces are (from north clockwise) Mukdahan, Amnat Charoen, Ubon Ratchathani, Sisaket, and Roi Et.

Geography
The northern half of the province consists of plains with low hills; the southern part consists of the river lowlands of the River Chi, with ponds and swamps.

Geology
Yasothon soils (rhodic ferralsols) formed in the Triassic before the uplift of the Khorat Plateau, are relict soils made fertile by field termites through bioturbation.

National park
There is one national park, along with five other national parks, make up region 9 (Ubon Ratchathani) of Thailand's protected areas. 
 Phu Sa Dok Bua National Park,

History
The province was created on 1 March 1972, when it was split off from Ubon Ratchathani.

Symbols
The seal of the province shows two mythical lions, called singh, facing the chedi Prathat Anon, in the temple Wat Maha That in the city of Yasothon. In the legendary account of the founding of the city, a lion came out of the forest when the site was chosen; hence the city was called Ban Singh Tha, Home (of) Imposing Lion. At the bottom of the seal is a lotus flower (Nymphaea lotus), as the lotus is both the provincial flower of the province and of Ubon Ratchathani province, of which Yasothon was part until 1972. The provincial tree is Anisoptera costata.

Administrative divisions

Provincial government
The province is divided into nine districts (amphoe). The districts are further subdivided into 78 subdistricts (tambon) and 885 villages (muban).

Local government
As of 26 November 2019 there are: one Yasothon Provincial Administration Organisation and 24 municipal (thesaban) areas in the province. Yasothon has town (thesaban mueang) status. Further 23 subdistrict municipalities (thesaban tambon). The non-municipal areas are administered by 63 Subdistrict Administrative Organisations - SAO (ongkan borihan suan tambon).

Transport 

Several bus lines connect the province at frequent intervals to Bangkok's Northern Bus Terminal, as well as all bus terminals in the north and northeast. Ubon Ratchathani province is 100 kilometres east on Route 23.

Human achievement index 2017

Since 2003, the United Nations Development Programme (UNDP) in Thailand has tracked progress on human development at the provincial level using the Human Achievement Index (HAI), a composite index covering eight key areas of human development. The National Economic and Social Development Board (NESDB) has taken over this task since 2017.

References

External links

Provincial page from the Tourist Authority of Thailand
Website of province(Thai) 

 
Isan
Provinces of Thailand